The Tasmanian Trades & Labor Council, also known as Unions Tasmania,  is a representative body of trade union organisations in the State of Tasmania, Australia. It is the peak union body in Tasmania, made up of affiliated unions who represent some 50,000 workers. It is the Tasmanian Branch of the Australian Council of Trade Unions (the ACTU).

As of 2017, the current Secretary of Unions Tasmania is Jessica Munday. Notable past Trades Hall Secretaries include:

 Lynne Fitzgerald was the first woman elected Secretary of an Australian State Trades and Labor Council in 1995.
 Jim Bacon was Secretary from 1989, before entering the Tasmanian House of Assembly in 1996 and becoming Premier of Tasmania for the period  1998 to 2004.
 Paul Lennon was Secretary from 1984 before elected to the Tasmanian House of Assembly in 1990, and becoming Premier in 2004.
 Robert Watling (aged 29) was Secretary from 1976 to 1980. Appointed as a Tasmanian Wages Boards Commissioner 1980–2003, then appointed as a Tasmanian Public Service Commissioner from 2004 to 2016.
 Richard William Brian Harradine was Secretary from 1968 to 1975, then entering Federal Parliament where he became Australia's longest serving independent Senator (1975-2005).
 John Henry O'Neil was Secretary from 1927 to 1958, then 1962 to 1967, and also secretary of the Eight Hours Day Committee in 1921 to 1967.

History

The Trades & Labor Council of Hobart was started in 1883. In 1917 it became known as the Hobart Trades Hall Council. In 1968, the separate Trades Halls of Hobart, Launceston and Devonport were amalgamated as the Tasmanian Trades & Labor Council.

External links
 Official website

https://directory.australianunions.org.au/union/UT

https://www.theadvocate.com.au/story/7916686/unions-tasmania-says-governments-wage-offer-falls-short/

Australian labour movement
Organisations based in Tasmania
Trades councils